The dimples of Venus (also known as back dimples, Duffy Dimples, butt dimples or Veneral dimples) are sagittally symmetrical indentations sometimes visible on the human lower back, just superior to the gluteal cleft. They are directly superficial to the two sacroiliac joints, the sites where the sacrum attaches to the ilium of the pelvis.
An imaginary line joining both dimples of Venus passes over the spinous process of the second sacral vertebra.

Overview
The term "dimples of Venus", while informal, is a historically accepted name within the medical profession for the superficial topography of the sacroiliac joints. The Latin name is fossae lumbales laterales ("lateral lumbar indentations"). These indentations are created by a short ligament stretching between the posterior superior iliac spine and the skin.

Named after Venus, the Roman goddess of beauty, they are sometimes believed to be a mark of beauty. The features may be seen on both female and male backs, but seem to be more common and more prominent in women. When seen in men, they are called "dimples of Apollo", named after the Greco-Roman god of male beauty. 

Another use of the term "dimples of Venus" in surgical anatomy refers to two symmetrical indentations on the posterior aspect of the sacrum, which also contain a venous channel. They are used as a landmark for finding the superior articular facets of the sacrum as a guide to place sacral pedicle screws in spine surgery.

In the 2010s,  back dimples became a popular location for women to get transdermal body piercings.

See also

Apollo's belt
Dimples
Lower-back tattoo
Rhombus of Michaelis
Sacral dimple
Venus Callipyge

References

Back anatomy
Human appearance
Physical attractiveness